The Kids Are Alright is the debut studio album by American R&B duo Chloe x Halle. It was released on March 23, 2018, by Beyoncé's record label Parkwood Entertainment. The album features guest collaborations from rappers GoldLink, Kari Faux and Joey Bada$$. The album earned them their first two career Grammy Award nominations for Best Urban Contemporary Album and Best New Artist for the 61st Grammy Awards.

The album is primarily a R&B album, although it features elements of trap. The album was supported by the title track, released as the lead single on January 3, 2018. Along with fourteen new songs, the album also featured "Grown", the track recorded by the duo that serves as the theme song for the American comedy series Grown-ish, as well as two songs from their 2016 EP Sugar Symphony. The song "Warrior" was featured in A Wrinkle in Time.

To promote the album, the duo performed the album track "Happy Without Me" and "The Kids Are Alright" on Jimmy Kimmel Live!, and released a 10-minute short film named after the album.

Background 
Chloe and Halle Bailey began work on the album "three years ago, since before our EP, and before our mixtape." In an interview with Time, the girls mentioned Beyoncé and Billie Holiday as inspirations for the record.

When asked about the title, Chloe said,"The title means so much to us; we're speaking about ourselves as we're growing into young women, telling ourselves we're going to be OK. We'll make mistakes and we'll have obstacles, but we'll overcome them. But then also in a general sense, with this generation and how the world has gone mad and all these crazy things that are left for this generation to handle, it's just proclaiming that we will be alright no matter what, and they shouldn't worry about us. I love being part of this generation because we're not afraid to let our voices be heard, and we're not afraid to speak our mind."

Critical reception 
The album received mostly positive reviews.

Writing for Refinery29, Courtney Smith stated, "Chloe x Halle write lyrics that address love, both universal and romantic, but do the latter from a place of power...  It's a reminder to not underestimate or infantilize them simply because they are young."

Sydney Gore for MTV wrote, "Overall, this record is loaded with catchy bops, hardcore bangers and beautiful ballads with uplifting messages that will surely turn into anthems for various experiences in your personal life."

Briana Younger, writing for Pitchfork said about the album, "The Beyoncé-approved sister act are fearless on their debut album, reshaping pop and R&B in their own images until even the highest-profile co-signs seem beside the point... Listening to their debut, it's easy to believe that if God spoke, she would sound like Chloe x Halle." Pitchfork rated the album 7.6 out of 10.

Gabe Bergado wrote in a review of the album for Teen Vogue, "Within the first few minutes of listening to Chloe x Halle's debut album The Kids Are Alright, you'll be completely entranced by the sisters' dreamy vocals and electrifying beats."

Alex Zidel wrote for HotNewHipHop, saying, "[The album wows] many with impressive chemistry and an undeniable charm." Also listing "Happy without Me" as an album highlight, he wrote, "In a pairing that not many expected would sound this beautiful, Joey Bada$$ and Chloe x Halle makes for a fantastic collaboration... Joey complements the pair's voices as he raps seamlessly throughout his bars."

The Kids Are Alright film 
Immediately following the release of the album, the duo released a short film on YouTube named after the album. The film highlights six songs from the album, and features a guest appearance by Ashton Sanders. The film was directed by Cara Stricker, and written and creative directed by Kwasi Fordjour.

Awards and nominations 

|-
! scope="row" | 2019
| Grammy Awards
| Best Urban Contemporary Album
| 

|-
! scope="row" | 2018
| Soul Train Awards
| Album of The Year
|

Track listing 
Credits adapted from ASCAP, Tidal, and SESAC.

Notes
  signifies a co-producer.
  signifies an additional producer.
 "Hi Lo", "Baptize", "Down", "Happy without Me" and "Cool People" feature vocal production by Chloe Bailey and Halle Bailey.
 "Fake", "Galaxy" and "Babybird" feature guitars by Halle Bailey.
 "Happy Without Me" features keyboard and programming by Adam Messinger, Nasri Atweh, Mikhail "Sad Money" Beltran and Chloe Bailey.

Charts

References 

2018 debut albums
Chloe x Halle albums
Columbia Records albums
Albums produced by Malay (record producer)
Albums produced by the Messengers (producers)